Leonardo Candi (born 30 March 1997) is an Italian professional basketball player who plays point guard for Bertram Derthona of the Lega Basket Serie A (LBA).

References

External links
 Eurocup Profile
 DraftExpress Profile
 Italian league Profile
 Scout Basketball Profile
 Real GM Profile

1997 births
Living people
Fortitudo Pallacanestro Bologna players
Italian men's basketball players
Lega Basket Serie A players
Pallacanestro Reggiana players
Point guards
Sportspeople from Bologna